Ibn Sab'īn was an Arab Sufi philosopher, the last philosopher of the Andalus in the west land of Islamic world. He was born in 1217 in Spain and lived in Ceuta. He was known for his replies to questions sent to him by Frederick II, ruler of Sicily. He died in 1271 in Mecca. He was also known for his knowledge of the "hidden sciences" and was well versed in knowledge of Islam and of other religions. 

His school is a combination of philosophical and Gnostic thoughts.

He was recognized by Michele Amari as the author, among others, of the responses to the famous Sicilian Questions of Frederick II, Holy Roman Emperor.

Notes

1217 births
1271 deaths
13th-century Arabs
Sufi mystics
Islamic philosophers
Philosophers from al-Andalus
Sufis from al-Andalus
13th-century Sufis